Deer Hunter is a series of hunting simulation video games. Originally available for Windows platform published by WizardWorks, it was also published on Mac, and later on Game Boy Color, PlayStation 2, and mobile phones.The first Deer Hunter game was an early success in the casual game market.

The original game was released in November 1997. In 2003, Southlogic Studios was commissioned by WizardWorks to develop Trophy Hunter 2003; and because of Trophy Hunter's success, they took over the development of the Deer Hunter franchise, with Deer Hunter 2004 and Deer Hunter 2005, distributed by Atari. Glu Mobile acquired the entire franchise in April 2012. The original Deer Hunter and its sequel Deer Hunter II have also been released for Macintosh computers.

Gameplay usually takes place in a thick forest or meadow during different seasons of the year. Animals and objects other than deer can be seen while playing, including Bigfoot and UFOs in some incarnations, but these serve no purpose other than scenery. Some animals may be shot and killed, but the player receives no trophy and will be penalized if the animal was a protected species. In the latest versions, players can also manage a deer herd with deer growth and genetics deciding the traits of offspring.

The franchise's main line games are: 1997's Deer Hunter, 1998's Deer Hunter II, 1999's Deer Hunter 3, 2001's Deer Hunter 4, 2001's Deer Hunter 5, 2002's Deer Hunter 2003, 2003's Deer Hunter 2004, 2004's Deer Hunter 2005, and 2008's Deer Hunter Tournament. After the release of Deer Hunter Tournament, every game bearing the franchise's name has been a mobile version, and there has not been a full-fledged game since; however, some of these versions have seen ports on Steam, to poor reviews.

Games

Compilations

Cancelled games

Reception
The original Deer Hunter released in 1997 sold nearly 64,700 units.

In the United States, Deer Hunter 4 sold 250,000 copies and earned $4.5 million by August 2006, after its release in November 2001. It was the country's 81st best-selling computer game between January 2000 and August 2006. Combined sales of all Deer Hunter games released between January 2000 and August 2006 had reached 1.4 million in the United States by the latter date.

See also

Cabela's Big Game Hunter, a 1998 hunting video game by HeadGames Publishing
Carnivores, a dinosaur hunting series, also by WizardWorks and Action Forms
Deer Avenger, a parodic series of hunting games by Simon & Schuster Interactive

References

External links
 Deer Hunter 4, 
 Deer Hunter 2015 , 5 , 2003, 2005  , Tournament  by Atari
 Deer Hunter , 2 , 3  for mobile by Glu Mobile
 Southlogic Studios, current developer of the series
 Sunstorm Interactive, original developer of the series

Atari games
First-person shooters
Electronic Arts franchises
Hunting video games
Video game franchises introduced in 1997
Video game franchises
Video games developed in the Czech Republic
Video games developed in the United States
Windows games